The second season of Designing Women premiered on CBS on September 14, 1987, and concluded on March 28, 1988. The season consisted of 22 episodes. Created by Linda Bloodworth-Thomason, the series was produced by Bloodworth/Thomason Mozark Productions in association with Columbia Pictures Television.

Cast

Main cast
 Dixie Carter as Julia Sugarbaker
 Annie Potts as Mary Jo Shively
 Delta Burke as Suzanne Sugarbaker
 Jean Smart as Charlene Frazier
 Co-starring Meshach Taylor as Anthony Bouvier

Recurring cast
 Scott Bakula as Ted Shively
 Priscilla Weems as Claudia Shively
 Brian Lando as Quinton Shively
 Alice Ghostley as Bernice Clifton
 Gerald McRaney as Dash Goff
 Hal Holbrook as Reese Watson
 Douglas Barr as Colonel Bill Stillfield
 George Newbern as Payne McIlroy
 Richard Gilliland as J.D. Shackleford

Guest cast

 Jonathan Banks as Eldon Ashcroft IV
 Terry Burns as Kyle Wellborn
 Eileen Seeley as Tammy
 Tony Goldwyn as Kendall Dobbs
 Camilla Carr as Imogene Salinger
 Elliott Reid as Lamar Tyson
 Marc Silver as Howard

 M. C. Gainey as T. Tommy Reed
 Lewis Grizzard as Clayton Sugarbaker
 John Dewey-Carter as Matthew Jarvis
 Keith Williams as Kyle Jarvis
 Arlen Dean Snyder as Ray Don Simpson
 Ivan Bonar as Wilmont Oliver
 Patrick Tovatt as Reverend Nunn

Episodes

DVD release
The second season was released on DVD by Shout! Factory on August 11, 2009.

References

External links
 

Designing Women seasons
1987 American television seasons
1988 American television seasons